Corneille Lentz (20 July 1879 – 10 March 1937) was a Luxembourgian painter. His work was part of the painting event in the art competition at the 1932 Summer Olympics.

References

1879 births
1937 deaths
20th-century Luxembourgian painters
20th-century male artists
Olympic competitors in art competitions
People from Mersch
Male painters